Saviour Machine I is the 1993 debut album of the American metal band Saviour Machine. In 2010, HM Magazine ranked it #72 on the Top 100 Christian metal albums of all-time list.

Recording history 
Saviour Machine I was recorded after the band signed a record deal with the Christian music label Frontline Records at The Green Room and The Mixing Lab. The album was produced by Terry Scott Taylor and co-produced and arranged by Eric Clayton. Saviour Machine I was mixed at The Mixing Lab by Gene Eugene and Bob Moon, and additional engineering was done by Drew Aldridge. The album was mastered by Doug Doyle at Digital Brothers, Costa Mesa, California. On this album the band's line-up consisted of the quartet Eric Clayton (vocals), Jeff Clayton (guitar), Dean Forsyth (bass), and Samuel West (drums). Bob Watson played piano, keyboard and conducted the orchestration, and backing vocals were sung by Jimmy P. Brown II (Deliverance), Love Larrimore, Riki Michelle, and Terry Taylor.

Reception 

According to Eric Clayton, a certain line in the song "Legion" was partially responsible for Saviour Machine I being banned from Christian book stores throughout the United States in the summer of 1993, only weeks after its release. The song's lyrics deal with apocalyptical themes about the rise of the Beast with a gothic horror approach. Because of the controversy surrounding "Legion" in particular, Saviour Machine I is still not distributed in the United States as of today. As a statement to this, since 1993 whenever the band has performed live, Eric Clayton has worn the flag of United States during the performance of "Legion".

Unlike the reception in the United States, Saviour Machine I achieved more notice in the Europe. Few gothic metal albums like this existed in the early 1990s, and Saviour Machine I is considered as some kind of landmark in that genre especially in the Christian metal movement. The British magazine Cross Rhythms rated the album a nine out of ten, opining that it was slightly better than the follow-up release, Saviour Machine II. Rock Hard rated the album a full ten-out-of-ten as they could not find a mediocre song on the album. In 2005, Saviour Machine I was ranked number 329 in Rock Hard magazine's book The 500 Greatest Rock & Metal Albums of All Time. Stefan Lang from Powermetal.de, in a retrospective review, considered the album one of the best from the 1990s. Also in a retrospective review, Tom Kernbichler of Darkscene.at lavished praise on the album, citing the band as the last revolutionary musical revelation in their life.

The album was re-released on Massacre Records in 1996 with different packaging.

Track listing 
Lyrics by Eric Clayton. Music by Eric Clayton and Jeff Clayton.

Personnel 

Saviour Machine
Eric Clayton – vocals
Jeff Clayton – guitars
Dean Forsyth – bass
Samuel West – drums

Additional musicians
Bob Watson – piano, keyboard and orchestration
Jimmy P. Brown II – backing vocals
Love Larrimore – backing vocals
Riki Michele – backing vocals
Terry Taylor – backing vocals

References 

1993 debut albums
Saviour Machine albums